laSexta2 was a Spanish television channel, owned and operated by Gestora de Inversiones Audiovisuales La Sexta, owned of laSexta. It was founded and started to broadcast on 1 October 2010 and ceased broadcasting on 1 May 2012 and was replaced by Xplora due its low ratings.

External links
Official Website

Defunct television channels in Spain
Television channels and stations established in 2010